The Industrial Emissions Directive (Directive 2010/75/EU of the European Parliament and of the Council of 24 November 2010 on industrial emissions (integrated pollution prevention and control)) is a European Union directive which commits European Union member states to control and reduce the impact of industrial emissions on the environment. The directive aims to lower emissions from industrial production through an integrated approach. The directive uses a polluter pays to assign the cost of the updates to the plant. The plan to lower emissions is based on Best available technology to help reach the goals of the directive. The plan allows for flexibility given the best available technology; exemptions to the directive can be granted to firms as well if the cost is greater than the benefit.

Rationale
The European Commission undertook a 2-year review with all stakeholders to examine how the legislation on industrial emissions could be improved to offer a high level of protection for the environment and human health while simplifying the existing legislation and cutting unnecessary administrative costs. Throughout Europe there is high acceptance that industrial emissions are the leading cause of pollution in Europe. As well there is high support for a system where the polluter will pay under a Polluter pays principle.

The IED is intended to provide significant improvement on the interaction between the previous seven directives (including the Waste Incineration Directive) which it replaces. It also strengthens, in several instances, some provisions in previous directives, for example the Large Combustion Plant Directive.

Exemptions
Certain firms are allowed to apply for exemptions when the cost of the best available technology is higher than the benefit. They will be evaluated using Cost–benefit analysis to decide if an exemption will be granted to the firm. Bulgaria is currently seeking an exemption for their whole fleet of coal fired power plants.

Criticism 
The exemptions have allowed for a large amount of Europe's power plants to exceed the set standards. There is concern that if the exemptions were removed some plants will be forced to shut down due to the increased cost associated with the best available technology. With the passing of stricter laws now makes it harder for some plants to receive an exemption from the directive.

References

External links
European Commission – Industrial Emissions
European IPPC Bureau Best Available Techniques (BAT) reference documents
Department for Environment, Food and Rural Affairs (England and Wales) – Implementation of the Directive
Ministry of Environment and Urbanism of Turkey, EU Project to implement Chapters 1 and 2 of the Directive, explanations in Turkish and English

Environmental law in the European Union
European Union directives
Pollution